The Northern Miner is a weekly trade journal (formerly part of the Hollinger group) that reports on the mining industry.  The Northern Miner began publication in Cobalt, Ontario, Canada, in 1915, and has since moved publication to Toronto.

The weekly journal is considered to be the "leading authority on the mining industry in Canada", and " the mining industry's bible".

References 

1915 establishments in Ontario
Trade magazines published in Canada
Weekly magazines published in Canada
Magazines established in 1915
Magazines published in Toronto